Lindisfarne, also called Holy Island,  is a tidal island off the northeast coast of England, which constitutes the civil parish of Holy Island in Northumberland. Holy Island has a recorded history from the 6th century AD; it was an important centre of Celtic Christianity under Saints Aidan, Cuthbert, Eadfrith, and Eadberht of Lindisfarne. The island was originally home to a monastery, which was destroyed during the Viking invasions but re-established as a priory following the Norman conquest of England. Other notable sites built on the island are St. Mary the Virgin parish church (originally built 635 AD and restored in 1860), Lindisfarne Castle, several lighthouses and a complex network of lime kilns. In the present day, the island is an Area of Outstanding Natural Beauty and a hotspot for historical tourism and bird watching. As of February 2020, the island had three pubs, a hotel and a post office.

Name and etymology

Name
Both the Parker and Peterborough versions of the Anglo-Saxon Chronicle for 793 record the Old English name .

In the 9th-century  the island appears under its Old Welsh name . The philologist Andrew Breeze, following up on a suggestion by Richard Coates, proposes that the name ultimately derives from Latin  (English: Healing [Island]), owing perhaps to the island's reputation for medicinal herbs.

The reference was to Saints Aidan and Cuthbert.

In the present day, Holy Island is the name of the civil parish and native inhabitants are known as Islanders. The Ordnance Survey uses Holy Island for both the island and the village, with Lindisfarne listed either as an alternative name for the island or as a name of 'non-Roman antiquity'.  "Locally the island is rarely referred to by its Anglo-Saxon name of Lindisfarne" (according to the local community website). More widely, the two names are used somewhat interchangeably. Lindisfarne is invariably used when referring to the pre-conquest monastic settlement, the priory ruins and the castle. The combined phrase The Holy Island of Lindisfarne has begun to be used more frequently in recent times, particularly when promoting the island as a tourist or pilgrim destination.

Etymology
The name Lindisfarne has an uncertain origin. The first part, Lindis-, may refer to people from the Kingdom of Lindsey in modern Lincolnshire, referring to either regular visitors or settlers. Another possibility is that Lindisfarne is Brittonic in origin, containing the element Lind- meaning stream or pool (Welsh ), with the nominal morpheme -as(t) and an unknown element identical to that in the Farne Islands. Further suggested is that the name may be a wholly Old Irish formation, from corresponding , plus  meaning land, domain, territory. Such an Irish formation, however, could have been based on a pre-existing Brittonic name.

There is also a supposition that the nearby Farne Islands are fern-like in shape and the name may have come from there.

Geography and population

The island of Lindisfarne is located along the northeast coast of England, close to the border with Scotland. It is accessible at low tide by a modern causeway and an ancient pilgrims' path that both run over sand and mudflats and which are covered with water at high tide. Lindisfarne is surrounded by the  Lindisfarne National Nature Reserve, which protects the island's sand dunes and the adjacent intertidal habitats. , the island had a population of 180.

Community
A February 2020 report provided an update on the island. At the time, three pubs and a hotel were operating; the store had closed but the post office remained in operation. No professional or medical services were available and residents were driving to Berwick-upon-Tweed for groceries and other supplies. Points of interest for visitors included Lindisfarne Castle operated by the National Trust, the priory, the historic church, the nature reserve and the beaches. At certain times of year, numerous migratory birds can be seen.

Causeway safety

Warning signs urge visitors walking to the island to keep to the marked path, to check tide times and weather carefully, and to seek local advice if in doubt. For drivers, tide tables are prominently displayed at both ends of the causeway and also where the Holy Island road leaves the A1 Great North Road at Beal. The causeway is generally open from about three hours after high tide until two hours before the next high tide, but the period of closure may be extended during stormy weather. Tide tables giving the safe crossing periods are published by Northumberland County Council.

Despite these warnings, about one vehicle each month is stranded on the causeway, requiring rescue by HM Coastguard and / or Seahouses RNLI lifeboat. A sea rescue costs approximately £1,900 (quoted in 2009), while an air rescue costs more than £4,000 (also quoted in 2009). Local people have opposed a causeway barrier, primarily on convenience grounds.

History

Early
The north-east of England was largely not settled by Roman civilians apart from the Tyne valley and Hadrian's Wall. The area had been little affected during the centuries of nominal Roman occupation. The countryside had been subject to raids from both Scots and Picts and was "not one to attract early Germanic settlement". The conquest was not straightforward, however. The  recounts how, in the 6th century, Urien, prince of Rheged, with a coalition of North Brittonic kingdoms, besieged Angles led by Theodric of Bernicia on the island for three days and nights, until internal power struggles led to the Britons' defeat.

Lindisfarne Priory

The monastery of Lindisfarne was founded around 634 by Irish monk Saint Aidan, who had been sent from Iona off the west coast of Scotland to Northumbria at the request of King Oswald. The priory was founded before the end of 634 and Aidan remained there until his death in 651. The priory remained the only seat of a bishopric in Northumbria for nearly thirty years. Finan (bishop 651–661) built a timber church "suitable for a bishop's seat". St Bede, however, was critical of the fact that the church was not built of stone but only of hewn oak thatched with reeds. A later bishop, Eadbert, removed the thatch and covered both walls and roof in lead. An abbot, who could be the bishop, was elected by the brethren and led the community. Bede comments on this:

Lindisfarne became the base for Christian evangelism in the North of England, and also sent a successful mission to Mercia. Monks from the Irish community of Iona settled on the island. Northumbria's patron saint, Saint Cuthbert, was a monk and later abbot of the monastery, and his miracles and life are recorded by the Venerable Bede. Cuthbert later became Bishop of Lindisfarne. An anonymous life of Cuthbert written at Lindisfarne is the oldest extant piece of English historical writing. From its reference to "Aldfrith, who now reigns peacefully", it is considered to date to between 685 and 704. Cuthbert was buried here, his remains later translated to Durham Cathedral (along with the relics of Saint Eadfrith of Lindisfarne). Eadberht of Lindisfarne, the next bishop (and later saint), was buried in the place from which Cuthbert's body was exhumed earlier the same year.

Cuthbert's body was carried with the monks, eventually settling in Chester-le-Street before a final move to Durham. The saint's shrine was the major pilgrimage centre for much of the region until its despoliation by Henry VIII's commissioners in 1539 or 1540. The grave was preserved, however, and when opened in 1827 yielded a number of artefacts dating back to Lindisfarne. The innermost of three coffins was of incised wood, the only decorated wood to survive from the period. It shows Jesus surrounded by the Four Evangelists. The most impressive find within the coffins was a gospel (known as the St Cuthbert Gospel or Stonyhurst Gospel from its association with Stonyhurst College): the manuscript, a relatively early and likely original one, was bound with embossed leather. When the body was placed in the shrine in 1104, other items were removed: a paten, scissors and a chalice of gold and onyx.

Following Finian's death, Colman became Bishop of Lindisfarne. Up to this point the Northumbrian (and latterly Mercian) churches had looked to Lindisfarne as the mother church. There were significant liturgical and theological differences with the fledgling Roman party based at Canterbury. According to Stenton: "There is no trace of any intercourse between these bishops [the Mercians] and the see of Canterbury". The Synod of Whitby in 663 changed this, as allegiance switched southwards to Canterbury and then to Rome. Colman departed his see for Iona, and Lindisfarne no longer held its previous importance.

In 735, the northern ecclesiastical province of England was established, with the archbishopric at York. There were only three bishops under York: Hexham, Lindisfarne and Whithorn, whereas Canterbury had the 12 envisaged by St Augustine. The Diocese of York roughly encompassed the counties of Yorkshire and Lancashire. Hexham covered County Durham and the southern part of Northumberland up to the River Coquet, and eastwards into the Pennines. Whithorn covered most of Dumfries and Galloway region west of Dumfries itself. The remainder, Cumbria, northern Northumbria, Lothian and much of the Kingdom of Strathclyde formed the diocese of Lindisfarne.

In 737, Saint Ceolwulf of Northumbria abdicated as King of Northumbria and entered the priory at Lindisfarne. He died in 764 and was buried alongside Cuthbert. In 830, his body was moved to Norham-upon-Tweed, and later his head was translated to Durham Cathedral.

Lindisfarne Gospels

At some point in the early 8th century the illuminated manuscript known as the Lindisfarne Gospels, an illustrated Latin copy of the Gospels of Matthew, Mark, Luke and John, was made, probably at Lindisfarne. The artist was possibly  Eadfrith, who later became Bishop of Lindisfarne. It is also speculated that a team of illuminators and calligraphers (monks of Lindisfarne Priory) worked on the text, but if so, their identities are unknown. Some time in the second half of the 10th century, a monk named Aldred added an Anglo-Saxon (Old English) gloss to the Latin text, producing the earliest surviving Old English copies of the Gospels. Aldred attributed the original to Eadfrith (bishop 698–721). The Gospels were written with a good hand, but it is the illustrations, done in an insular style containing a fusion of Celtic, Germanic and Roman elements, that are considered to be of the most value. According to Aldred, Eadfrith's successor Æthelwald was responsible for pressing and binding the book, before it was covered with a fine metal case made by a hermit known as Billfrith. The Lindisfarne Gospels now reside in the British Library in London, a location which has caused some controversy amongst some Northumbrians. In 1971, professor Suzanne Kaufman of Rockford, Illinois presented a facsimile copy of the Gospels to the clergy of the island.

Viking raid on the monastery (793)

In 793, a Viking raid on Lindisfarne caused much consternation throughout the Christian west, and is now often taken as the beginning of the Viking Age. There had been some other Viking raids, but according to English Heritage this one was particularly significant, because "it attacked the sacred heart of the Northumbrian kingdom, desecrating 'the very place where the Christian religion began in our nation'". The D and E versions of the Anglo-Saxon Chronicle record:

 ("In this year fierce, foreboding omens came over the land of the Northumbrians, and the wretched people shook; there were excessive whirlwinds, lightning, and fiery dragons were seen flying in the sky. These signs were followed by great famine, and a little after those, that same year on 6th ides of January, the ravaging of wretched heathen men destroyed God's church at Lindisfarne.")

Alcuin, a Northumbrian scholar in Charlemagne's court at the time, wrote: "Never before has such terror appeared in Britain as we have now suffered from a pagan race ... The heathens poured out the blood of saints around the altar, and trampled on the bodies of saints in the temple of God, like dung in the streets."

During the attack many of the monks were killed, or captured and enslaved. As the English population became more settled, they seemed to have abandoned seafaring. Many monasteries were established on islands, peninsulas, river mouths and cliffs, as isolated communities were less susceptible to interference and the politics of the heartland. These preliminary raids, despite their brutal nature, were not followed up. The main body of the raiders passed north around Scotland. The 9th century invasions came not from Norway, but from the Danes from around the entrance to the Baltic. The first Danish raids into England were in the Isle of Sheppey, Kent during 835 and from there their influence spread north. By 866, the Danes were in York, and in 873 the Danish army was moving into Northumberland. With the collapse of the Northumbrian kingdom, the monks of Lindisfarne fled the island in 875 taking with them St Cuthbert's bones (which are now buried at the cathedral in Durham), who during his life had been prior and bishop of Lindisfarne; his body was buried on the island in the year 698.

Prior to the 9th century, Lindisfarne Priory had, in common with other such establishments, held large tracts of land which were managed directly or leased to farmers with a life interest only. Following the Danish occupation, land was increasingly owned by individuals, and could be bought, sold and inherited. Following the Battle of Corbridge in 914 Ragnald seized the land giving some to his followers Scula and Onlafbal.

Middle Ages
William of St Calais, the first Norman Bishop of Durham, endowed his new Benedictine monastery at Durham with land and property in Northumberland, including Holy Island and much of the surrounding mainland. Durham Priory re-established a monastic house on the island in 1093, as a cell of Durham, administered from Norham. The standing remains date from this time (whereas the site of the original priory is now occupied by the parish church).

Monastic records from the 14th to the 16th century provide evidence of an already well-established fishing economy on the island. Both line fishing and net fishing were practised, inshore in shallow waters and in the deep water offshore, using a variety of vessels: contemporary accounts differentiate between small 'cobles' and larger 'boats', as well as singling out certain specialised vessels (such as a 'herynger', sold for £2 in 1404). As well as supplying food for the monastic community, the island's fisheries (together with those of nearby Farne) provided the mother house at Durham with fish, on a regular (sometimes weekly) basis. Fish caught included cod, haddock, herring, salmon, porpoise and mullet, among others. Shellfish of various types were also fished for, with lobster nets and oyster dredges being mentioned in the accounts. Fish surplus to the needs of the monastery was traded, but subject to a tithe. There is also evidence that the monks operated a lime kiln on the island.

In 1462, during the Wars of the Roses, Margaret of Anjou made an abortive attempt to seize the Northumbrian castles. Following a storm at sea 400 troops had to seek shelter on Holy Island, where they surrendered to the Yorkists.

The Benedictine monastery continued until its suppression in 1536 under Henry VIII, after which the buildings surrounding the church were used as a naval storehouse. In 1613 ownership of the island (and other land in the area formerly pertaining to Durham Priory) was transferred to the Crown.

An early scholarly description of the priory was compiled by Dr Henry George Charles Clarke (presumed son of Admiral Sir Erasmus Gower)  in 1838 during his term as president of the Berwickshire Naturalists' Club. Dr Clarke surmised that this Norman priory was unique in that the centre aisle had a vault of stone. Of the six arches, Dr Clarke stated "as if the architect had not previously calculated the space to be occupied by his arcade. The effect here has been to produce a horse-shoe instead of a semicircular arch, from its being of the same height, but lesser span, than the others. This arch is very rare, even in Norman buildings". The Lindisfarne Priory (ruin) is a grade I listed building, List Entry Number 1042304. Other parts of the priory are a Scheduled ancient monument, List Entry Number 1011650. The latter are described as "the site of the pre-Conquest monastery of Lindisfarne and the Benedictine cell of Durham Cathedral that succeeded it in the 11th century".

Recent work by archeologists was continuing in 2019, for the fourth year. Artifacts recovered included a rare board game piece, copper-alloy rings and Anglo-Saxon coins from both Northumbria and Wessex. The discovery of a cemetery led to finding commemorative markers "unique to the 8th and 9th centuries". The group also found evidence of an early medieval building, "which seems to have been constructed on top of an even earlier industrial oven" which was used to make copper or glass.

St. Mary the Virgin
The parish church stands on the site of the wooden church built by St. Aidan in 635 AD. When the abbey was rebuilt by the Normans, the site of the original priory church was redeveloped in stone as the parish church. As such it is now the oldest building on the island still with a roof on. Remains of the Saxon church exist as the chancel wall and arch. A Norman apse (subsequently replaced in the 13th century) led eastwards from the chancel. The nave was extended in the 12th century with a northern arcade, and in the following century with a southern arcade.

After the Reformation the church slipped into disrepair until the restoration of 1860. The church is built of coloured sandstone which has had the Victorian plaster removed from it. The north aisle is known as the "fishermen's aisle" and houses the altar of St. Peter. The south aisle used to hold the altar of St. Margaret of Scotland, but now houses the organ.

The church is a Grade I listed building number 1042304, listed as part of the whole priory. The church forms most of the earliest part of the site and is a scheduled ancient monument number 1011650.

For several years in the late 20th century ( 1980~1990), religious author and cleric David Adam ministered to thousands of pilgrims and other visitors as rector of Holy Island.

Lindisfarne Castle

Lindisfarne Castle was built in 1550, around the time that Lindisfarne Priory went out of use, and stones from the priory were used as building material. It is very small by the usual standards, and was more of a fort. The castle sits on the highest point of the island, a whinstone hill called Beblowe.

After Henry VIII suppressed the priory, his troops used the remains as a naval store. In 1542 Henry VIII ordered the Earl of Rutland to fortify the site against possible Scottish invasion. Sir John Harington and the Master Mason of Berwick started to plan to build two earth bulwarks, although the Rutland advised the use of stone from the abbey. In September 1544 a Scottish fleet led by John Barton in the Mary Willoughby theatened the English coast. It was thought the Scottish ships might try to burn Lindisfarne, so orders were given to repair the old decayed bulwark or blockhouse at Holy Island.

By December 1547, Ralph Cleisbye, Captain of the fort, had guns including a wheel-mounted demi-culverin, two brass sakers, a falcon, and another fixed demi-culverin. However, Beblowe Crag itself was not fortified until 1549 and Sir Richard Lee saw only a decayed platform and turf rampart there in 1565. Elizabeth I then had work carried out on the fort, strengthening it and providing gun platforms for the new developments in artillery technology. When James VI and I came to power in England, he combined the Scottish and English thrones, and the need for the castle declined. At that time the castle was still garrisoned from Berwick and protected the small Lindisfarne Harbour.

During the Jacobite rising of 1715 the Earl of Mar (later commander of the Jacobite army) planned for a Franco-Spanish invasion of North-East England to link up with indigenous Jacobites and the Scottish army marching south.  The Holy Island was regarded by Mar as the ideal place for a landing.  The following day, however, he decided on a more southerly landing.

Lindisfarne was close to Bamburgh which at that time was owned by Thomas Forster who was a committed Jacobite.  The Jacobites wanted to secure the castle on the Holy Island so as "to give signals to the ships from which they expected succours from abroad".  The castle was sealed but only held by around 6 men.  The brigantine Mary of the Tyne, ex France was anchored in the bay.  The master, Lancelot Errington, went ashore on 10 October 1715 to ask Samuel Phillipson, the castle's Master Gunner who also served as the unit's barber, for a shave.  The men knew each other and so this seemed entirely innocent.  Errington established that only two soldiers (Phillipson and Farggison) and Phillipson's wife were actually in the castle, the rest of the garrison being off duty.  Errington returned with his nephew later in the day claiming to have lost the key to his watch then pulled a pistol on Phillipson and ejected the three people.  Forster was expected to send reinforcements to the castle but, for some unknown reason, never did.

The following day Colonel Laton with a hundred troops arrived from Berwick and was joined by fifty of the islanders in retaking the castle.  The Erringtons fled, were caught and imprisoned in the tollbooth at Berwick but tunneled their way out and escaped back to Bamburgh.  On the 14 October two French ships signaled to the castle, but on receiving no reply withdrew.

The castle was later refurbished in the Arts and Crafts style by Sir Edwin Lutyens for the editor of Country Life, Edward Hudson. Lutyens also designed the island's Celtic-cross war-memorial on the Heugh. Lutyens' upturned herring busses near the foreshore provided the inspiration for Spanish architect Enric Miralles' Scottish Parliament Building in Edinburgh.

One of the most celebrated gardeners of modern times, Gertrude Jekyll (1843–1932), laid out a tiny garden just north of the castle in 1911.  The castle, garden and nearby lime kilns are in the care of the National Trust and open to visitors.

Lighthouses

Trinity House operates two light beacons (which it lists as lighthouses) to guide vessels entering Holy Island Harbour. Until 1 November 1995 both were operated by Newcastle-upon-Tyne Trinity House (a separate corporation, which formerly had responsibility for navigation marks along the coast from Berwick-upon-Tweed to Whitby). On that day, responsibility for marking the approach to the harbour was assumed by the London-based Corporation.

Heugh Hill Light is a metal framework tower with a black triangular day mark, situated on Heugh Hill (a ridge on the south edge of Lindisfarne). Prior to its installation, a wooden beacon with a triangle topmark had stood on the centre of Heugh Hill for many decades. Nearby is a former coastguard station, recently refurbished and opened to the public as a viewing platform. An adjacent ruin is known as the Lantern Chapel; its origin is unknown, but the name may indicate an earlier navigation light on this site.

Guile Point East and Guile Point West are a pair of stone obelisks standing on a small tidal island on the other side of the channel. The obelisks are leading marks which, when aligned, indicate the safe channel over the bar. When Heugh Hill bears 310° (in line with the church belfry) the bar is cleared and there is a clear run into the harbour. The beacons were established in 1826 by Newcastle-upon-Tyne Trinity House (in whose ownership they remain). Since the early 1990s, a sector light has been fixed about one-third of the way up Guile Point East.

Not a lighthouse but simply a daymark for maritime navigation, a white brick pyramid, 35 feet high and built in 1810, stands at Emmanuel Head, the north-eastern point of Lindisfarne. It is said to be Britain's earliest purpose-built daymark.

Modern

A Dundee firm built lime kilns on Lindisfarne in the 1860s, and lime was burnt on the island until at least the end of the 19th century. The kilns are among the most complex in Northumberland. Horses carried limestone, along the Holy Island Waggonway, from a quarry on the north side of the island to the lime kilns, where it was burned with coal transported from Dundee on the east coast of Scotland. There are still some traces of the jetties by which the coal was imported and the lime exported close by at the foot of the crags. The remains of the waggonway between the quarries and the kilns makes for a pleasant and easy walk. At its peak over 100 men were employed. Crinoid columnals extracted from the quarried stone and threaded into necklaces or rosaries became known as St Cuthbert's beads. The large-scale quarrying in the 19th century had a devastating effect on the interesting limestone caves, but eight sea caves remain at Coves Haven.

Workings on the lime kilns stopped by the start of the 20th century. The lime kilns on Lindisfarne are among the few being actively preserved in Northumberland.

Holy Island Golf Club was founded in 1907 but later closed in the 1960s.

Present day
The island is within an Area of Outstanding Natural Beauty on the Northumberland Coast. The ruined monastery is in the care of English Heritage, which also runs a museum/visitor centre nearby. The neighbouring parish church is still in use.

Turner, Thomas Girtin and Charles Rennie Mackintosh all painted on Holy Island.

Holy Island was considered part of the Islandshire unit along with several mainland parishes. This came under the jurisdiction of the County Palatine of Durham until the Counties (Detached Parts) Act 1844.

Lindisfarne was mainly a fishing community for many years, with farming and the production of lime also of some importance.

The Holy Island of Lindisfarne is well known for mead. In the medieval days when monks inhabited the island, it was thought that if the soul was in God's keeping, the body must be fortified with Lindisfarne mead. The monks have long vanished, and the mead's recipe remains a secret of the family which still produces it; Lindisfarne Mead is produced at St Aidan's Winery, and sold throughout the UK and elsewhere.

Even today it is possible to see old wooden boats turned upside down on the land, looking like sheds. It is possible that this type of settlement was used by seafaring Vikings that exploited their ships as protection while away from home.

The isle of Lindisfarne was featured on the television programme Seven Natural Wonders as one of the wonders of the north. The Lindisfarne Gospels have also featured on television among the top few Treasures of Britain. It also features in an ITV Tyne Tees programme Diary of an Island which started on 19 April 2007 and on a DVD of the same name.

Community Trust Fund/Holy Island Partnership
In response to the perceived lack of affordable housing on the isle of Lindisfarne, in 1996 a group of islanders established a charitable foundation known as the Holy Island of Lindisfarne Community Development Trust. They built a visitor centre on the island using the profits from sales. In addition, eleven community houses were built and are rented out to community members who want to continue to live on the island. The trust is also responsible for management of the inner harbour. The Holy Island Partnership was formed in 2009 by members of the community as well as organisations and groups operating on the island.

Tourism

Tourism grew steadily throughout the 20th century, and the isle of Lindisfarne is now a popular destination for visitors. Those tourists staying on the island while it is cut off by the tide experience the island in a much quieter state, as most day trippers leave before the tide rises. At low tide it is possible to walk across the sands following an ancient route known as the Pilgrims' Way (see the note about safety, above). This route is marked with posts and has refuge boxes for stranded walkers, just as the road has a refuge box for those who have left their crossing too late. The isle of Lindisfarne is surrounded by the  Lindisfarne National Nature Reserve which attracts bird-watchers to the tidal island. The island's prominent position and varied habitat make it particularly attractive to tired avian migrants, and  330 bird species had been recorded on the island.

In popular fiction
Most of LJ Ross' crime novel Holy Island (2015) is set on Lindisfarne. Much of Ann Cleeves' mystery novel The Rising Tide is also located here.

The Viking raid appears in season one of the television series Vikings.

Arms

Notes

Citations

References

Further reading

External links

 Holy Island Safe Crossing Times
 Lindisfarne Priory – English Heritage
 Video: Holy Island Causeway information
 Lindisfarne Castle – National Trust
 
  Lindisfarne Visitor Information Official visitor information site
  Visit Lindisfarne Locally-run information site 

 
Anglo-Norse England
History of Northumberland
Ramsar sites in England
Sites of Special Scientific Interest in Northumberland
Ports and harbours of Northumberland
Celtic Christianity
Populated coastal places in Northumberland
Tidal islands of England
Islands of Northumberland
Monasteries dissolved under the English Reformation
Lime kilns in the United Kingdom
Civil parishes in Northumberland